William Lambie may refer to:
 William Lambie (footballer), Scottish footballer
 William Lambie (Jamaica), politician, planter and slave-owner in Jamaica
 William Thomas Lambie, American civil engineer and member of the Los Angeles council
 W. J. Lambie (William John Lambie), Australian journalist and war correspondent

See also
 William Lambie Nelson, politician in Queensland, Australia